Norilsk Nickel, or Nornickel, is a Russian nickel and palladium mining and smelting company. Its largest operations are located in the Norilsk–Talnakh area near the Yenisei River in the north of Siberia. It also has holdings in Nikel, Zapolyarny, and Monchegorsk on the Kola Peninsula, in Harjavalta in western Finland, and in South Africa.

Headquartered in Moscow, Norilsk Nickel is the world's largest producer of refined nickel and the 11th largest copper producer.

The company is listed on MICEX-RTS. As of March 2021, its key shareholders were Vladimir Potanin's Olderfrey Holdings Ltd (34.59%) and Oleg Deripaska's Rusal (27.82%).

In December 2010, Norilsk Nickel made a share buyback offer for Rusal's 25% share in the company for $12 billion, but the offer was declined. In 2012, Potanin's Interros holding, Rusal, and Roman Abramovich signed a shareholder agreement on the size of dividend payouts to end a conflict over the matter, as well as issues around the company's broader strategy and management. The agreement expires on June 1, 2023, and the prospects of its extension or suspension are unclear. In March 2019, Abramovich sold a 1.7% stake in the company for $551 million, predominantly to British-based and Russian investors. Potanin and Deripaska's Rusal were blocked from purchasing any shares.

History
Mining began in the Norilsk area in the 1920s.  The Soviet government established the Norilsk Combine in 1935 and passed control to the NKVD. In 1943, Norilsk produced 4,000 tonnes of refined nickel and in 1945 hit the target figure of 10,000 tonnes. The mining and metal production originally used forced labour from the Gulag system.

In 1993, after the fall of the Soviet Union, a joint-stock company called RAO Norilsk Nickel was created. Two years later, control over the deeply indebted company, which was bleeding cash at a rate of about $2 million a day against the background of falling nickel prices, was sold to a private company, Interros. By the end of privatization in 1997, the company had moved into the black, and workers were being paid. The current average pay exceeds $1,000 per month with an annual paid leave of two to three months. Nevertheless, the working and living conditions in Norilsk remain harsh, although they are improving as the company shuts down old factories that are the source of excessive pollution.

In July 2000, Norilsk Nickel joined forces with the St. Petersburg Research Institute of the Arctic and Antarctic, to investigate the potential use of decommissioned nuclear powered submarines, both from the United States and Russia, to transport materials along the Northern Sea Route. Overhaul and refit costs came to $72–80 million per submarine, which included modifying its ice-breaking bow to cut through ice up to 215 cm (85 in) thick in seawater and up to 150 cm (59 in) in the freshwater mouth of the Yenisei. Decommissioned Typhoon submarines were expected to transport up to 12,000 tonnes of supplies and nickel between Dudinka and either Murmansk or Arkhangelsk. In 2000, the Murmansk Shipping Company (MMP or MSCO) provided icebreaker services at a charge of $11.35 per tonne of cargo. Three submarines - the project feasibility threshold -  were scheduled for refit and overhaul between 2000 and 2003.

However, the stakeholders failed to reach an agreement as to who would conduct and cover the refit and overhaul of the submarines. Furthermore, money was not the only issue. Under the existing international agreements,  decommissioned nuclear-powered submarines from the two countries’ navies had to be dismantled. Should this obstacle be addressed, subsequent ownership of the refitted submarines also remained unclear: whether they would remain the assets of the Ministry of Defense or would be transferred to another governmental agency. One of the options suggested by Nornickel was to establish a joint transportation company that would lease the vessels.

In 2002, Nornickel accounted for the most of MMP's  shipping along the Northern Sea Route. In 2008, Aker Yards signed a contract with Norilsk Nickel for the delivery of four container/cargo ships for Arctic operations, with an option for a fifth.

In 2002, MMC Norilsk Nickel began purchasing gold mining assets, which were spun off in 2005 as Polyus Gold.

In 2003, the company took control of Stillwater Mining Company, the only palladium producer in the U.S. Stillwater operates a platinum group metals (PGM) facility in Stillwater, Montana. In November 2010, Norilsk Nickel announced the sale of Stillwater.

Throughout 2007, Norilsk acquired a host of mining and metallurgical assets abroad, transforming into a multinational company with operations in Australia, Botswana, Finland, Russia, South Africa, and the United States. Norilsk Nickel signed its key deal on June 28, 2007, acquiring about 90 percent of Canada's LionOre Mining International Ltd, the world's tenth-largest nickel producer at the time. This takeover, valued at $6.4 billion, was the biggest foreign acquisition by a Russian company at the time, making Norilsk Nickel the world's largest nickel producer.

On February 27, 2008, Norilsk Nickel diversified into the coal mining industry through North Star LLC by obtaining mining rights to the amount of 33.6 million rubles for the estimated 5.7 billion tonnes of coal at the Syradasai Field near the port of Dikson in the Taymyrsky Dolgano-Nenetsky District. In the coal mining industry, it competed with Rio Tinto and BHP Billiton. By the estimates of North Star LLC, a firm affiliated with Nornickel, developing the field would require an investment of $1.5 billion, which including the necessary expansion of the port of Dikson, another Nornickel asset. The only competitor for the rights to the Syradasai Field was Golevskaya Mining Company LLC.  The Syradasai Field is 105 to 120 km southeast of Dikson in the Taimyr-Turukhansk support zone. A 120-kilometer road and railway was expected to connect the deep-sea port on Cape Chaika to the massive coal deposit by 2019. CC VostokUgol or Vostok Coal planned to export up to 10 million tonnes of coal annually from the open-pit mine to Western Europe and the Asia-Pacific regions.

In 2018, North Star LLC changed owners to become part of businessman Roman Trotsenko's AEON Group. Neither Nornickel nor AEON disclosed the transfer of ownership terms.

In 2016 Nornickel ranked below 65 other oil, gas and mining companies in a list of 92 involved in onshore resource extraction above the Arctic Circle, in terms of handling indigenous rights.

In the Arctic Environmental Responsibility Index (AERI), Norilsk Nickel is ranked No. 38 out of 120 oil, gas, and mining companies involved in resource extraction north of the  Arctic Circle.

Operations

Nornickel is Russia's largest non-ferrous metallurgy company and one of the 10 largest private enterprises in the country.

In 2019, the company produced 229,000 tonnes of nickel, 499,000 tonnes of copper, 2.9 million ounces of palladium, and 0.7 million ounces of platinum.

Globally, Nornickel ranks:
 First in nickel production (accounting for 14% of global and 96% of Russian production). Bloomberg hails Nornickel as the world's most efficient nickel producer
 First in palladium production with a share of 41%
 Third in platinum production with a share of 10%

Nornickel also produces rhodium, cobalt, copper, silver, gold, iridium, ruthenium, selenium, tellurium, and sulfur.

Proven and possible reserves:

 6.5 million tonnes of nickel
 11.6 million tonnes of copper
 118 million troy ounces of platinum-group metals

The company's revenue in 2020 reached $15.5 billion, with net profits of $3.6 billion.

Formed 250 million years ago during the eruption of the Siberian Traps igneous province (STIP), the Norilsk-Talnakh nickel deposits are the largest nickel-copper-palladium deposits in the world. The STIP disgorged over 1 million cubic kilometers of lava, a large portion of it through a series of flat-lying lava conduits below Norilsk and the Talnakh Mountains. The Siberian Traps are considered to be responsible for the late-Permian mass extinction event.

The district's first mineral resources were discovered in the 1840s when Alexander von Middendorff's expedition found the local coal deposits. In the 1860s, Friedrich Schmidt described the coal and surface copper ore found in the field that would later be called Norilsk 1. In the early days of the Soviet Union, Nikolay Urvantsev's expeditions revealed several industrially significant deposits. The 1930s saw the construction of the Norilsk Mining and Metallurgy Combine, which remains the pillar of local industry to date. The fields are located along the deep Norilsk-Khatanga Fault, and most mining operations employ underground methods. The area is believed to hold around 35% of the world's known nickel reserves, as well as 10% of its copper, 15% of its cobalt, and 40% of its platinum-group metals. The district's fields are divided into two clusters: the Norilsk Cluster in the southwest and the Talnakh Cluster in the northeast.

In 2022 Norilsk Nickel reiterated its output guidance for the year and said that operations remain uninterrupted. In the first update since the invasion of Ukraine, the miner said first-quarter nickel production increased 10% year-on-year to 52,000 tons. Palladium output declined 8% to 706,000 ounces and platinum fell by 12% to 163,000 ounces, but only from a higher-than-normal level a year ago.

Norilsk Ore Cluster
The cluster is located below Norilsk's city center and to the south of it, in the north-eastern part of the Norilsk Geological Basin. In 2021, Norilsk Nickel estimated the mineral reserves of the cluster at 156.6 million tonnes of ore, 400,000 tonnes of nickel, 600,000 tonnes of copper, and 25.6 million troy ounces of platinum-group metals. The rights to some of the cluster's deposits belong to Russian Platinum, but the corporation is unable to start mining because Nornickel, which controls the remote area's infrastructure, is blocking access. The two conflicting parties have a protracted history of negotiating a joint mining enterprise.

Norilsk 1 Field
The district's first actively developed field is located in the south of Norilsk's city center and to the south of the city. It is 30 to 350 meters thick. The northern part of the deposit consists of two branches: the “Coal Stream” and the “Bear Stream”. Extraction has been ongoing since the 1940s at the Zapolyarny Mine through both underground and open-pit mining of the Coal Stream and Bear Stream quarries. The reserves of its northern section have mostly been depleted, and mining in the Coal Stream quarry has ceased.

Russian Platinum obtained the mining rights to the southern section in 2012 but has not yet used them because of its conflict with Nornickel.

Norilsk 2 Field
The field is located near Mount Gudchikha to the east of Norilsk 1. In 1926, Nikolay Urvantsev discovered copper-nickel ore in the area, and mining began in the 1930s. However, the deposit turned out to be minor, and the decision was made to focus on Norilsk 1. Prospecting continued throughout the 1950s, but after the Talnakh Cluster was discovered, Norilsk 2 was abandoned.

Maslov Field
Located to the south of Norilsk 1, this field is believed to be an offshoot of the latter. Prospecting began here in the 1970s. The field stretches for over six kilometers from north to south and includes the northern and southern sections. Two by four kilometers in size, the northern section is up to 300 meters thick, while the southern estate, which is up to 400 meters thick, has an area of three by 1.5 kilometers[8]. The mining rights to the deposit belong to Nornickel, which in 2019 announced plans to launch an underground mining operation by 2029.

Chernogorskoye Field
The field is located to the east of the Maslov Field near Mount Chernaya. An intrusion with a mineral composition similar to that of Norilsk 1 is up to 200 meters thick. In 2021, Russian Platinum signed a memorandum with VEB.RF and VTB to develop the field. The plans include open-pit mining in the eastern field section with an option for the subsequent underground development of its western part.

Talnakh Ore Cluster
The cluster is located below the Talnakh District and to its northeast, in the southwest of the Kharayelakh Geological Basin. Following the discovery of its rich reserves of copper-and-nickel ore, the cluster became Norilsk's primary source of mineral resources. Its proven resources include over 100 kinds of ore minerals, many of which were previously unknown to science: talnakhite, godlevskite, shadlunite, taimyrite, sobolevskite, mayakite, and more. In 2021, Nornickel assessed the cluster's mineral reserves at 1,5 billion tonnes of ore, 11.2 million tonnes of nickel, 11.2 million tonnes of copper, and 231.7 million troy ounces of platinum-group metals.

Talnakh Field
The field stretches from north to south along the Norilsk-Khatanga Fault and includes its graben and the adjacent intrusions from the east. The primary development facilities are the Mayak, the Komsomolsky, and the Skalisty mines.

Oktyabrskoye Field
The field is located to the west of the Norilsk-Khatanga Fault. The primary development facilities are the Oktyabrsky and the Taimyrsky mines. The Oktyabrsky deposit accounts for about half of Norilsk Nickel's ore production.

Production divisions
The company currently has five core operational divisions in three countries:
The Polar Division of MMC Norilsk Nickel and ancillary activities, located on the Taimyr Peninsula
Kola MMC and ancillary activities, located on the Kola Peninsula (incorporating the Pechenganickel Combine in Nikel and Zapolyarny and the Severonickel Combine in Monchegorsk). The plant in Nikel closed in December 2020.
Norilsk Nickel Harjavalta, Finland's only nickel refining plant, purchased from OM Group in 2007
Norilsk Nickel Africa, which includes stakes in mines in Botswana (85% of Tati Nickel) and in South Africa (50% of Nkomati), both formerly owned by LionOre

Environmental problems
Norilsk Nickel is known to be one of Russia's largest industrial polluters, releasing approximately 1.9 million tonnes of sulfur dioxide into the air annually as of 2020, accounting for 1.9% of global emissions. Ore is smelted on site in Norilsk. The smelting is directly responsible for severe pollution, including acid rain and smog.

The pollution originating from the Kola division of the company was also affecting Norway, which has been offering financial support to clean up the operation since 1990. In December 2020, Norilsk Nickel shut down its old smelter in the town of Nikel on the Russia-Norway border.

In 2008, Rosprirodnadzor (the Federal Environmental, Industrial, and Nuclear Supervision Service of Russia) demanded that a 4.35-billion ruble ($60-million) fine be imposed on Nornickel for polluting minor rivers with wastewater.

The environmental problems at Norilsk stretch back for decades. Back in 2004, oligarch Mikhail Prokhorov claimed that Nornickel would resolve most of the area's environmental issues within 5–6 years. By 2008, this timeline had been moved to 2015. However, Nornickel claims to be a socially responsible business and invests in modernization.

Norilsk Nickel has been working consistently to reduce emissions of major air pollutants. In 2006, the company reported an investment of more than $5 million in the maintenance and overhaul of its dust-and-gas recovery and removal systems. The company asserts a commitment of nearly $1.4 million for its air pollution prevention plan. However, according to the official statistics, emissions remain extremely high. In 2006, Blacksmith Institute, an international non-profit organization, included Norilsk in its list of the world's 10 most polluted places. Nornickel wrote a protest letter but to no avail. According to local environmental experts, in spite of minor reductions in overall pollution levels, the levels of SO2, HS, phenol, formaldehyde, and dust have increased, with the levels of nickel and copper showing 50% growth. The morbidity rate remains stable, though the mortality rate is decreasing.

In 2010, Vladimir Putin visited Norilsk and complained about the pollution, threatening a “significant increase in environmental fines” if the company did not modernize its plant. By 2013, owner Vladimir Potanin had begun to invest in environmental measures. In June 2016, Norilsk shut down one of its factories, which was emitting 380,000 tonnes of sulfur dioxide every year, 25% of the total of sulfur emissions in the city, in an effort to clean up its environmental record. It also said it would invest 300 billion rubles to modernize manufacturing by 2020.
 
In 2016, Norilsk Nickel admitted that a spillage at one of its facilities had been responsible for a river in the Russian Arctic turning blood-red. The heavy rains on 5 September 2016 caused a filtration dam at the Nadezhda Plant to overflow into the Daldykan River. Indigenous groups have accused the company of lax safety standards.

At the end of 2016, Nornickel signed a contract with Canadian company SNC-Lavalin to introduce sulfur dioxide filtration and storage technologies on its plant in Norilsk in what was lauded as one of the largest environmental projects of its kind. Once the project reached completion in 2020, sulfur emissions dropped by up to 75%.

In April 2018, amid rising pressure from the Russian government and Western investment funds, the company announced its plans to invest in a processing plant worth $1 billion, which would convert sulfur dioxide produced during the metal smelting process into gypsum. The plant will be finished in 2022, in time for the company to meet its target of reducing harmful emissions by 75% and avoid financial fines 100 times higher than the current ones.

In 2019, the group's total environmental protection expenditures were reported to have rocketed by 117.9%. The cornerstone of Nornickel's environmental program is the $3.5-billion SO2 Project. Aimed at recycling toxic SO2 emissions, the goal of the project is to achieve a 75% cut in SO2 emissions in Nornickel's hometown of Norilsk by 2023, growing to 90% by 2025.

In 2020, Nornickel presented a new environmental strategy with ambitious targets  to be reached by 2030 in six environmental protection areas. To honor its commitments, the company shut down Kola MMC's smelting shop in Nikel in 2020, eliminating 100% of sulfur dioxide emissions near the Russia-Norway border,  followed by its copper smelter in Monchegorsk in March 2021. Combined with Nornickel's other green initiatives, these steps are expected to ensure an 85% decrease in sulfur dioxide pollution in the Murmansk Region by late 2021.

In December 2020, Norilsk Nickel reiterated plans to cut group sulfur dioxide emissions in the Norilsk area by 90% by 2025 from 2015 levels and earmarked $5.5 billion for environmental projects, including $3.6 billion for sulfur dioxide capture and processing.

2020 fuel spill

On May 29, 2020, a Soviet-era fuel storage tank owned by Nornickel subsidiary Norilsk-Taimyr Energy (NTEK) collapsed, flooding the nearby Daldykan River with some 20,000 tonnes of diesel. Russian President Vladimir Putin declared a state of emergency.  The diesel oil was intended for the NTEK coal-fired combined heat and power plant as backup fuel. The fuel storage tank failed when the underlying permafrost began to soften. An area of up to 350 square kilometers (135 square miles) was contaminated. The cleanup efforts were complicated by a lack of roads and the river being too shallow for boats or barges to pass. Former deputy head of Rosprirodnadzor Oleg Mitvol estimated the clean-up cost at about 100 billion rubles ($1.5 billion) and set a timeline of five to 10 years. In September 2020, the company reported having collected more than 90% of the leaked fuel.

Environmental Resources Management, the international company which provides Norilsk Nickel with consulting services on environmental issues, identified the cause of the accident as subsidence resulting from the gradual melting of the permafrost on which the piles supporting the fuel storage tank stood. According to the results of the official investigation, some of the piles were shorter than the designed length and rested on the permafrost rather than being sunk into the bedrock. According to specialists, the average annual temperature in Russia is growing more than 2.5–2.8 times faster than the global average. Russia's Far North, including the Taymyr Peninsula, is heating up faster than anywhere else in the country, melting the permafrost on which many structures stand.

However, Zhanna Petukhova, director of the Arctic Permafrost Research Center, says that the tanks do in fact stand on piles driven into the bedrock, rather than the permafrost. She believes the accident is more likely to have been due to the poor condition of equipment dating back to the Soviet era.

In February 2021, the Krasnoyarsk Arbitration Court ordered Nornickel to pay 146 billion rubles ($2 billion) in compensation for the spill damage to support environmental projects in the Krasnoyarsk Territory. Nornickel had claimed the damages should be calculated at 21 billion rubles ($280 million).

Finland 
Norilsk Nickel's nickel-cobalt refinery at Harjavalta, western Finland, released 66 tonnes of nickel as nickel sulphate into the local Kokemäenjoki (Kokemäki River) on 5–6 July 2014. Refinery coolant water recirculated from the river was accidentally contaminated by process water over a 30-hour period through an equipment failure. Nickel concentrations were 400 times normal levels, with the accident becoming the largest known leak in Finnish history. Elevated nickel values in river waters were recorded for ~20 days before declining to normal levels.

In December 2020, the company reported, citing a research paper, that the population of mussels in Kokemäenjoki had been recovering, purporting that the water protection measures had been successful and the burden on the river had been reduced.

Carbon footprint
Norilsk Nickel reported Total CO2e emissions (Direct + Indirect) for 31 December 2020 at 9,699 Kt (-253 /-2.5% y-o-y). There is little evidence of a consistent declining trend as yet.

Related organizations
The  in St Petersburg is in charge of the design and construction of Nornickel's facilities. Gipronickel does research in every field of metallurgy, including extraction, patenting, design and more.

Norilsk Nickel uses the Yenisei River port of Dudinka to load its finished product on ships for export.

The Moscow-based Interros Holding Company is the controlling shareholder of Nornickel.

Nornickel also attempted to operate Nakety/Bogota, a nickel mine on the island of New Caledonia in the South Pacific, in partnership with Argosy Minerals of Australia but has withdrawn from this project.

In 2016, Nornickel established the Global Palladium Fund to promote industrial demand for palladium and to reduce volatility in the palladium market. The fund's objective is to act as a platform to facilitate cooperation between major palladium holders.

Competition
Nornickel's chief competitors in the production of nickel and of palladium are Vale, BHP and Anglo American Platinum.

Fleet
The company's fleet provides sea transportation of cargo and concentrates from Norilsk to ports with rail connections. In 2008, Norilsk Nickel commissioned the construction of five ice-breaking cargo freighters.

See also

Nickel mining and extraction
Copper mining and extraction
Emily Ann and Maggie Hays nickel mines
London Platinum and Palladium Market
London Metal Exchange

References

External links

The Moscow Times: Norilsk Nickel withdraws from Nakety Bogota project
MBendi's MMC Norilsk Nickel information page
The Metallurgical Complex at Norilsk in Siberia
JSC MMC Norilsk Nickel Company History
 Russian metals firm admits spillage turned river blood red The Guardian, 2016.

Mining companies of Russia
Nickel mining companies
Copper mining companies of Russia
Palladium mining companies
Platinum mining companies
Companies based in Moscow
Krasnoyarsk Krai
Non-renewable resource companies established in 1993
1993 establishments in Russia
Companies listed on the Moscow Exchange
Norilsk
Vladimir Potanin